Pleurophyllum is a genus of subantarctic plants in the tribe Astereae within the family Asteraceae.

Pleurophyllum  is native to the subantarctic islands of New Zealand (the Auckland Islands, Campbell Island and the Antipodes Islands) and Australia (Macquarie Island).

 Species
 Pleurophyllum criniferum Hook.f., = P. oresigenesum, Albinia oresigenesum 
 Pleurophyllum hookeri Buch. 
 Pleurophyllum speciosum Hook.f.

References

 
Asteraceae genera